Tripodanthus is a genus of flowering plants belonging to the family Loranthaceae.

Its native range is Southern Tropical America.

Species:
 Tripodanthus acutifolius (Ruiz & Pav.) Tiegh. 
 Tripodanthus belmirensis F.J.Roldán & Kuijt
 Tripodanthus flagellaris (Cham. & Schltdl.) Tiegh.

References

Loranthaceae
Loranthaceae genera